Highway 271 is a highway in the Canadian province of Saskatchewan. It runs from Highway 21 in Maple Creek until Battle Creek Road, Fort Walsh, within the Cypress Hills Interprovincial Park.

Highway 271 also connects with Highways 724 and 615.

References

271